Dougie Padilla (born July 28, 1948) is a Chicano poet, multimedia visual artist, and activist. He is of Norwegian and Mexican lineage and works between Minneapolis, Minnesota and Pepin, Wisconsin. Padilla is considered an autodidact in visual art. He is well known for his work with the traveling art collective Grupo Soap del Corazón and as a founder of Art-A-Whirl, America’s largest open studio tour.

Early life 

Padilla was born in Iowa in 1948 and grew up in St. Louis Park, Minnesota. His mother taught him music, rendering him proficient in playing the piano and the French horn.

Padilla's father came from a Mexican lineage, with which Padilla also identifies. Before college, he spent time hitchhiking across the country. Much of his two years at Lake Forest College were devoted to marching, picketing, and protesting. In Colorado, he briefly encountered Chicano poet, activist, and political organizer Corky Gonzales as well as other Chicano activists. Padilla also trained with Chicano activist Reies Tijerina’s Alianza in New Mexico in the late 1960s.

In 1968, Padilla moved to California, immersing himself in the counterculture movement. He spent time in both San Francisco and Berkeley, learning from spiritual leaders visiting at the time, such as Ram Das, Swami Muktananda, and Suzuki Roshi. At age 20 Padilla experienced his first heart failure, causing him to further explore spirituality. 

In the late 1970s, Padilla worked with poet and activist Robert Bly, who became a significant teacher and mentor. He helped Bly found the mythopoetic men’s movement.

Artistic inspiration and style 
Mexican influence is incorporated into all of his art. Over his lifetime, Padilla’s work has seen multiple phases. He began with music and poetry as a youth, moved to mask making and drawing, and then transitioned to painting, ceramics, and printmaking.

As of 1992, he moved to ritual artwork. Padilla was influenced by the Mexican tradition of Día de Los Muertos (Day of the Dead) and the making of ofrendas. The Day of the Dead resonates with him due to his past ritual practice with Native American and African medicine men. After the passing of his father in 1992, Padilla felt a way to stay in touch with him was through this ritualistic work. His current visual artworks contain many images of Mexican-style calaveras, or skulls, as he appreciates the traditional Mexican relationship with death. His representation of skulls signals joy, believing they create a connection between this world and the spirit world.

Major works

Grupo Soap del Corazón 
Founded in 2000 by Padilla and Xavier Tavera, Grupo Soap del Corazón is a community art group that “celebrates Latino artists/culture and the Latinization of Minnesota and the upper Midwest of the USA.” In an attempt to further the “Latinization of Minnesota and the upper Midwest of the USA,” Padilla co-created Grupo Soap del Corazón with a mix of artists from different ethnic backgrounds and origins: Latinx, Native American, African, and Euro-American. Today they represent almost 90 local, national, and international artists. The collective is mobile and focuses on artwork that is easily transported and translated into different community contexts. 

In 2006 the group showcased two exhibitions in Valparaiso, Chile, including “El otro Americano (The Other American)” at El Instituto Chileno Norteamericano de Cultura. This exhibition fostered connections across identities and cultures, supporting relationships among North and South Americans. More locally, the group has worked on the “Pepin Portrait Project,” photographing residents of rural Pepin, Wisconsin. In 2021, Grupo Soap del Corazón published a zine, “Fabulista 2,” featuring political cartoons and poetry by Padilla along with the work of other artists in the collective. This zine attempts to encapsulate the struggles endured by Chicanxs/Latinxs and focuses on the political uprising of the summer of 2020.

Poetry 
Padilla returned to poetry in 2019, publishing River Town and Pepin Diaries with Luna Brava Press.

Contemporary life 
, Padilla lives in the Northeast Minneapolis Arts District that he co-created, commuting to his studio Dougieland Pepin located in Pepin, Wisconsin.

References 

1948 births
American people of Norwegian descent
American poets of Mexican descent
American artists of Mexican descent
Artists from Minneapolis
People from Pepin, Wisconsin
Artists from Iowa
People from St. Louis Park, Minnesota
Men's movement in the United States
Activists from Minnesota
American activists of Mexican descent
American anti–Vietnam War activists
Poets from Minnesota